Warta refers to:
Warta, a river in Poland
Warta, Poland, a town in Poland
Warta Bolesławiecka, a village in Poland
Warta Gorzów Wielkopolski, a football club in Gorzów Wielkopolski, Poland
Warta Nabada District,  district in Somalia
Warta Polpharma, a maxi-catamaran
Warta Poznań, a football club in Poznań, Poland
Warta Zawiercie (football), a football club in Zawiercie, Poland
Warta Zawiercie (volleyball), a volleyball club in Zawiercie, Poland